Marcia Diamond (23 November 1925 – 12 February 2021) was a Canadian actress.

Born in Calgary, Marcia attended school in Vancouver and participated in school broadcast over CBR. While at Northwestern University in Illinois in the 1940s, Marcia was heard in a number of plays on the Northwestern University Radio Playhouse productions.

Marcia was married to Harry Irving Cohen and had children.

Partial filmography

Class of '44 (1973) - Mrs. Gilhuly
Deranged (1974) - Jenny Kootz
Black Christmas (1974) - Woman
125 Rooms of Comfort (1974) - Doris
Ticket to Heaven (1981) - Esther
Sing (1989) - Jewish Mother
Sam & Me (1991) - Hannah Cohen
PCU (1994) - Pampers Woman
Spy Games (1999) - Lauren

References

External links
 

1925 births
2021 deaths
Actresses from Calgary
Canadian film actresses
Northwestern University alumni